The checkered whiptail (Aspidoscelis tesselata) is a species of lizard found in the southwestern United States in Colorado, Texas and New Mexico, and in northern Mexico in Chihuahua and Coahuila. Many sources believe that the species originated from the hybridization of the marbled whiptail, Aspidoscelis marmorata, the plateau spotted whiptail, Aspidoscelis septemvittata, and possibly the six-lined racerunner, Aspidoscelis sexlineata. It is one of many lizard species known to be parthenogenic. It is sometimes referred to as the common checkered whiptail to differentiate it from several other species known as checkered whiptails.

Description 
The checkered whiptail grows to a body length (head to back legs) of about 4 inches, with a tail length of 5-6 inches. Their pattern and base coloration varies widely, with brown or black blotching, checkering or striping on a pale yellow or white base color. Their rear legs often have dark spotting, and their underside is usually white with dark flecking on the throat area. They are slender bodied, with a long tail.

Behavior 
Like other species of whiptail lizard, the checkered whiptail is diurnal and insectivorous. They are wary, energetic, and fast moving, darting for cover if approached. They are found in semi-arid, rocky habitats, normally in canyon lands or hilled regions. They are parthenogenic, laying up to eight unfertilized eggs in mid summer, which hatch in six to eight weeks.

References 
 
 Herps of Texas: Cnemidophorus tesselatus

Aspidoscelis
Fauna of the Southwestern United States
Reptiles of the United States
Reptiles of Mexico
Reptiles described in 1823
Taxa named by Thomas Say